Kalatrazan Rural District is a rural district (dehestan) in Kalatrazan District, Sanandaj County, Kurdistan Province, Iran. At the 2006 census, its population was 8,196, in 1,900 families. The rural district has 23 villages.

References 

Rural Districts of Kurdistan Province
Sanandaj County